The 2001–02 UEFA Cup was won by Feyenoord at their home ground in the final against Borussia Dortmund. It was the second time they won the competition.

Liverpool could not defend their title as they automatically qualified for the 2001–02 UEFA Champions League and also reached the knockout stage.

Association team allocation
A total of 145 teams from 51 UEFA associations participated in the 2001–02 UEFA Cup. Associations are allocated places according to their 2000 UEFA league coefficient.

Below is the qualification scheme for the 2001–02 UEFA Cup:
Associations 1–6 each enter three teams
Associations 7–8 each enter four teams
Associations 9–15 each enter two teams
Associations 16–21 each enter three teams
Associations 22–49 each enter two teams, with the exception of Liechtenstein who enter one.
Associations 50-51 each enter one team
The top three associations of the 2000–2001 UEFA Fair Play ranking each gain an additional berth
16 teams eliminated from the 2001–02 UEFA Champions League qualifying rounds
8 teams eliminated from the 2001–02 UEFA Champions League group stage are transferred to the UEFA Cup
3 winners of the Intertoto Cup
The winner of the 2000–01 UEFA Cup (not used due to Liverpool's qualification to Champions League)

Association ranking

Notes
(FP): Additional fair play berth (Finland, Slovakia, Belarus)
(UCL): Additional teams transferred from the UEFA Champions League
(IT): Additional teams from Intertoto Cup

Distribution

Redistribution rules
A UEFA Cup place is vacated when a team qualify for both the Champions League and the UEFA Cup, or qualify for the UEFA Cup by more than one method. When a place is vacated, it is redistributed within the national association by the following rules:<
 When the domestic cup winners (considered as the "highest-placed" qualifier within the national association) also qualify for the Champions League, their UEFA Cup place is vacated, and the remaining UEFA Cup qualifiers are moved up one place, with the final place (with the earliest starting round) taken by the domestic cup runners-up, provided they do not already qualify for the Champions League or the UEFA Cup. Otherwise, this place is taken by the highest-placed league finisher which do not qualify for the UEFA Cup yet.
 When the domestic cup winners also qualify for the UEFA Cup through league position, their place through the league position is vacated, and the UEFA Cup qualifiers which finish lower in the league are moved up one place, with the final place taken by the highest-placed league finisher which do not qualify for the UEFA Cup yet.
 A place vacated by the League Cup winners is taken by the highest-placed league finisher which do not qualify for the UEFA Cup yet.
 A Fair Play place is taken by the highest-ranked team in the domestic Fair Play table which do not qualify for the Champions League or UEFA Cup yet.

Teams
The labels in the parentheses show how each team qualified for the place of its starting round:
 CW: Cup winners
 CR: Cup runners-up
 LC: League Cup winners
 Nth: League position
 P-W: End-of-season European competition play-off winners
 FP: Fair play
 IT: Intertoto Cup winners
 CL: Relegated from the Champions League
 GS: Third-placed teams from the group stage
 Q3: Losers from the third qualifying round

Qualifying round
All times are CEST (UTC+2).

|}

First leg

Second leg

BATE Borisov won 5–2 on aggregate.

Olimpija Ljubljana won 7–0 on aggregate.

HJK won 3–1 on aggregate.

Viking won 2–1 on aggregate.

Gorica won 1–0 on aggregate.

1–1 on aggregate. Birkirkara won on away goals.

Brașov won 7–1 on aggregate.

Fylkir won 3–2 on aggregate.

Rapid București won 12–0 on aggregate.

Rapid Wien won 3–0 on aggregate.

Maccabi Tel Aviv won 7–0 on aggregate.

Ružomberok won 3–1 on aggregate.

Slovan Bratislava won 5–0 on aggregate.

Apollon Limassol won 5–4 on aggregate.

Helsingborg won 5–2 on aggregate.

CSKA Kyiv won 4–0 on aggregate.

CSKA Sofia won 5–2 on aggregate.

Hapoel Tel Aviv won 5–0 on aggregate.

Elfsborg won 5–3 on aggregate.

Obilić won 5–1 on aggregate.

Nistru Otaci won 3–1 on aggregate.

Dinamo Zagreb won 2–0 on aggregate.

Gaziantepspor won 4–1 on aggregate.

Litex Lovech won 3–1 on aggregate.

Partizan won 8–1 on aggregate.

Matador Púchov won 4–2 on aggregate.

Brøndby won 5–0 on aggregate.

Olympiakos Nicosia won 6–4 on aggregate.

Legia Warsaw won 6–1 on aggregate.

3–3 on aggregate. St. Gallen won on away goals.

Standard Liège won 6–4 on aggregate.

Varteks won 9–4 on aggregate.

Dinamo București won 4–1 on aggregate.

Grazer AK won 6–2 on aggregate.

2–2 on aggregate. Osijek won on away goals.

Midtjylland won 5–1 on aggregate.

AEK Athens won 8–0 on aggregate.

Club Brugge won 10–1 on aggregate.

Marítimo won 2–0 on aggregate.

Kilmarnock won 2–0 on aggregate.

Polonia Warsaw won 6–0 on aggregate.

First round

|}

1 Only one leg was played, in a neutral venue in Warsaw, Poland, due to security concerns in Russia.

2 PSG won 3–0 because there was a blackout in Bucharest at that time and the match was stopped immediately in favour of the visitors.

First leg

Second leg

3–3 on aggregate. Maccabi Tel Aviv won on away goals.

Paris Saint-Germain were awarded a 3–0 victory for the second leg as Rapid București walked out, therefore winning 3–0 on aggregate

Roda JC won 6–1 on aggregate.

Hertha BSC won 3–0 on aggregate.

Wacker Innsbruck won 1–0 on aggregate.

Hapoel Tel Aviv won 2–1 on aggregate.

Troyes won 6–2 on aggregate.

Wisła Kraków won 3–2 on aggregate.

Internazionale won 6–0 on aggregate.

Copenhagen won 4–2 on aggregate.

Bordeaux won 6–4 on aggregate.

Osijek won 3–1 on aggregate.

Union Berlin won 4–1 on aggregate.

Dynamo Moscow won 1–0 on aggregate.

Utrecht won 6–3 on aggregate.

Parma won 3–0 on aggregate.

Litex Lovech won 3–1 on aggregate.

Slovan Liberec won 2–1 on aggregate.

Zaragoza won 5–1 on aggregate.

Grasshopper won 6–2 on aggregate.

3–3 on aggregate. Helsingborg won on away goals.

CSKA Sofia won 4–2 on aggregate

Ipswich Town won 3–2 on aggregate.

Viking won 3–1 on aggregate.

Halmstad won 2–1 on aggregate.

Chelsea won 5–0 on aggregate.

Marila Příbram won 5–3 on aggregate.

Freiburg won 2–1 on aggregate.

Rangers won 1–0 on aggregate after only one game was played.

PAOK won 4–0 on aggregate.

CSKA Kyiv won 3–2 on aggregate.

St. Gallen won 3–2 on aggregate.

Servette won 2–1 on aggregate.

Twente won 4–1 on aggregate.

Ajax won 5–0 on aggregate.

Club Brugge won 9–3 on aggregate.

AEK Athens won 4–3 on aggregate.

Rapid Wien won 5–2 on aggregate.

Brøndby won 4–2 on aggregate.

Milan won 6–0 on aggregate.

Celta Vigo won 8–3 on aggregate.

Legia Warsaw won 10–2 on aggregate.

Leeds United won 3–1 on aggregate.

Standard Liège won 4–2 on aggregate.

3–3 on aggregate. Varteks won on away goals.

Valencia won 6–0 on aggregate.

Sporting CP won 6–2 on aggregate.

Fiorentina won 2–1 on aggregate.

Second round

|}

First leg

Second leg

Internazionale won 2–1 on aggregate.

Litex Lovech won 2–0 on aggregate.

AEK Athens won 5–3 on aggregate.

PAOK won 8–3 on aggregate.

Freiburg won 4–2 on aggregate.

Milan won 3–0 on aggregate.

Rangers won 7–2 on aggregate.

Hertha BSC won 3–0 on aggregate.

Roda JC won 5–3 on aggregate.

Paris Saint-Germain won 6–2 on aggregate.

Slovan Liberec won 4–3 on aggregate.

Grasshoppers won 6–4 on aggregate.

Brøndby won 6–3 on aggregate.

Bordeaux won 4–0 on aggregate.

Leeds United won 6–5 on aggregate.

Club Brugge won 7–0 on aggregate.

Servette won 1–0 on aggregate.

Fiorentina won 4–2 on aggregate.

Copenhagen won 1–0 on aggregate.

Ipswich Town won 3–1 on aggregate.

Parma won 3–1 on aggregate.

Hapoel Tel Aviv won 3–1 on aggregate.

Sporting CP won 7–2 on aggregate.

Valencia won 7–2 on aggregate.

Third round

|}

First leg

Second leg

Borussia Dortmund won 2–0 on aggregate.

Hapoel Tel Aviv won 3–1 on aggregate.

Roda JC won 2–1 on aggregate.

Parma won 4–1 on aggregate.

Servette won 3–0 on aggregate.

AEK Athens won 4–3 on aggregate.

Lille won 3–0 on aggregate.

4–4 on aggregate. Lyon won on away goals.

PSV Eindhoven won 6–4 on aggregate.

1–1 on aggregate. Valencia won 5–4 on penalties.

Feyenoord won 3–2 on aggregate.

Slovan Liberec won 5–2 on aggregate.

Internazionale won 4–2 on aggregate.

Leeds United won 4–3 on aggregate.

0–0 on aggregate. Rangers won 4–3 on penalties.

Milan won 3–1 on aggregate.

Fourth round

|}

First leg

Second leg

Slovan Liberec won 5–2 on aggregate.

Hapoel Tel Aviv won 2–1 on aggregate.

Feyenoord won 4–3 on aggregate.

Valencia won 5–2 on aggregate.

Internazionale won 5–3 on aggregate.

1–1 on aggregate. Borussia Dortmund won on away goals.

1–1 on aggregate. Milan won 3–2 on penalties.

PSV Eindhoven won 1–0 on aggregate.

Quarter-finals

|}

First leg

Second leg

2–2 on aggregate. Feyenoord won 5–4 on penalties.

Borussia Dortmund won 4–0 on aggregate.

Milan won 2–1 on aggregate.

Internazionale won 2–1 on aggregate.

Semi-finals

|}

First leg

Second leg

Feyenoord won 3–2 on aggregate.

Borussia Dortmund won 5–3 on aggregate.

Final

Top scorers

See also
2001–02 UEFA Champions League
2001 UEFA Intertoto Cup

Notes

References

External links
2001–02 All matches UEFA Cup – season at UEFA website
Official Site
Results at RSSSF.com
 All scorers 2001–02 UEFA Cup according to (excluding preliminary round) according to protocols UEFA + all scorers preliminary round
2001/02 UEFA Cup – results and line-ups (archive)
Regulations of UEEFA Cup 2001–02

 
UEFA Cup seasons